Popeye Meets the Man Who Hated Laughter, also known as The Man Who Hated Laughter, is a 1972 American animated one-hour television film that was part of The ABC Saturday Superstar Movie. This film united characters from almost every newspaper comic strip then owned by King Features Syndicate in one story. The show aired on October 7, 1972, and was repeated in February 1974.

This film marked the first time that Steve Canyon, The Phantom, Tim Tyler, or Flash Gordon appeared in animation. In the 1980s, the cartoon series Defenders of the Earth would feature Flash Gordon, Mandrake the Magician, and The Phantom as freedom fighters united against a common enemy, Ming the Merciless.

Plot
Professor Morbid Grimsby is an evil genius who has won the prestigious "Meanie" award six years in a row; to guarantee a seventh, he plots to eliminate all laughter by getting rid of the Sunday funnies, with the aid of his henchman Brutus.

Popeye is given a job as captain of the Professor's yacht, the SS Hilarious, and all the characters from the humorous comic strips are informed that they have won a free ocean voyage upon this boat. Once out at sea, the boat is pulled to a remote island by the Professor's tractor beam, and in the chaos Popeye's stash of spinach is lost at sea; thus, he and all the passengers are prisoners of the Professor.

Being a huge fan of the Sunday funnies, the President of the United States takes action by calling together the heroes of the adventure comics to rescue the prisoners. The rescue attempts go wrong, and the adventure characters also end up as prisoners.

The prisoners eventually decide that the only way to free themselves is to make the Professor laugh, to convince him that the world needs laughter. They put on a talent show which fails to have an effect, but then the younger characters get him to laugh by showing him his own reflection in a mirror while he's trying to scare them; the Professor has a change of heart, and decides to let everyone go.

At that moment, however, a volcano on the island begins to erupt; the Professor uses his submarine to get the comic characters off the island, but it gets stuck in a cavern. Popeye finds his spinach in the water, eats it, and frees the submarine. The story ends with the comic characters and the Professor being treated to a party on the White House lawn; they're told that the President will join them shortly. Unbeknownst to the guests, he is actually at that moment enjoying the comics page of his newspaper.

Comic strips
Characters from the following comic strips appeared in this film:

 Barney Google and Snuffy Smith
 Blondie
 Beetle Bailey
 Bringing Up Father
 Flash Gordon
 Henry
 Hi and Lois
 The Katzenjammer Kids
 Little Iodine
 The Little King
 Mandrake the Magician
 The Phantom
 Popeye
 Prince Valiant (cameo)
 Quincy
 Steve Canyon
 Tiger
 Tim Tyler's Luck

Production
Jack Mercer, best known for being the voice of Popeye, provided the voices of Popeye and Wimpy in this movie; Bob McFadden and Corinne Orr provided all the other voices.

Home media
The film has not been released on home media.

References

External links
 
 Nolan's Pop Culture Review #321
 

1972 animated films
1972 films
1972 television films
Animated crossover films
The ABC Saturday Superstar Movie
Popeye
Flash Gordon films
The Phantom
Popeye the Sailor television series
The Katzenjammer Kids
1970s American films